Clarence Geoghan "Kid" Baldwin ( – ) was an American Major League Baseball catcher. He played seven seasons at the Major League level. In addition to playing catcher, Baldwin also played outfield, third base, second base, and first base. He also pitched two games in the  season. He played well until the mid-August collapse of the Pacific Northwest League.

References

External links 

 
Baseball Almanac
MLB

1864 births
1897 deaths
19th-century baseball players
Major League Baseball catchers
Chicago Browns/Pittsburgh Stogies players
Cincinnati Red Stockings (AA) players
Cincinnati Reds players
Philadelphia Athletics (AA) players
Kansas City Cowboys (UA) players
Portland Webfeet players
Quincy Quincys players
Springfield, Illinois (minor league baseball) players
St. Paul Apostles players
Duluth Whalebacks players
Spokane Bunchgrassers players
Los Angeles Seraphs players
New Orleans Pelicans (baseball) players
Baseball players from Kentucky
People from Newport, Kentucky